Shahmukhi, also known as Pakistani Punjabi, is an Abjad developed from the Perso-Arabic alphabet script, used for the Punjabi language. It came into use in Punjabi Sufi literature, from the 12th century and onwards. It is generally written in the Nastaʿlīq calligraphic hand, which is also used for Urdu. Shahmukhi script is the standard script in Pakistani Punjab used for Punjabi. Perso-Arabic is one of two scripts used for Punjabi, the other being Gurmukhi used in the Indian Punjab.

Shahmukhi is written from right to left, while Gurmukhi is written from left to right. It is also used as the main alphabet to write Pahari–Pothwari in the Punjab and Azad Kashmir.

The Shahmukhi alphabet was first used by the Sufi poets of Punjab, and became the conventional writing style for the Muslim populace of the Pakistani province of Punjab following the Partition of India, while the largely Hindu and Sikh modern-day state of Punjab, India adopted the Gurmukhi or seldom, the Devanagari scripts to record the Punjabi language.

Shahmukhi script is a modified version of the Arabic script. It was introduced by the Muslim Sufi poets in the 12th century for Punjabi language. While it is virtually identical to the Urdu alphabet, it is sometimes considered as a superset when additional letters are attempted to be included, representing Punjabi phonology; hence all Urdu readers can naturally read Shahmukhi (and vice versa) without any practical difficulty. For writing Saraiki, an extended Shahmukhi is used that includes 4 additional letters for the implosive consonants.

History 
The name 'Shahmukhi' is a recent coinage, imitating its counterpart 'Gurmukhi'. However, the writing of Punjabi in the Perso-Arabic script is well-attested from the 12th century onwards. According to Dhavan, Punjabi began to adopt the script as a "side effect" of educational practices in Mughal-era Punjab, when Punjabi Muslims learned the Persian language in order to participate in Mughal society. Educational materials taught Persian to Punjabi speakers by using Punjabi written in Persian's alphabet, which was a novel innovation. This was one of the first attempts in writing and standardising the Punjabi language; prior to this, Punjabi was primarily a spoken language, not formally taught in schools.

Shackle suggests that the Gurmukhi script was not favoured by Punjabi Muslims due to its religious (Sikh) connotations.

Alphabet

Vowel diacritics 
Like Urdu, Shahmukhi also has diacritics, which are implied - a convention retained from the original Arabic script, to express short vowels.

Consonants 

The digraphs of aspirated consonants are as follows.

Aspirates 

 Vowels are expressed as follows:

Difference from Persian and Urdu 

Shahmukhi has more letters added to the Urdu base to represent sounds not present in Urdu, which already has additional letters added to the Arabic and Persian base itself to represent sounds not present in Arabic. Furthermore, a separate do-cashmi-he letter, exists to denote a /ʰ/ or a /ʱ/, this letter is mainly used as part of the multitude of digraphs, detailed below. Characters added which differ from Urdu include: ࣇ to represent /ɭ/ and ݨ to represent /ɳ/. These characters, however are rarely used.

Loanwords
In Punjabi, there are many Arabic and Persian loanwords. These words contain some sounds which were alien to South Asian languages before the influence of Arabic and Persian, and are therefore represented by introducing dots beneath specific Gurmukhi characters. Since the Gurmukhi alphabet is phonetic, any loanwords which contained pre-existing sounds were more easily transliterated without the need for characters modified with subscript dots.

 is pronounced 'j' in French or as vion in English

 is often transliterated in many ways due to its changing sound in various Arabic and Persian words.

Gallery

See also
Gurmukhī alphabet
Saraiki alphabet

References

Further reading

External links
 Shahmukhi to Gurmukhi Transliteration System: A Corpus based Approach
 The Western Panjabi Alphabet 
 Learn Shahmukhi
 Likhari in Shahmukhi
 Kalam-e-Baba Nanak
 Punjabi and Punjab
 E-Book on Gurmukhi and Shahmukhi
 PDF on Gurmukhi and Shahmukhi

Arabic alphabets
Orthographies by language
Punjabi language
Arabic alphabets for South Asian languages